The 1894 New Hampshire football team was an American football team that represented New Hampshire College of Agriculture and the Mechanic Arts during the 1894 college football season—the school became the University of New Hampshire in 1923. The team played a five-game schedule, including the program's first contests against other college teams, Bates and Saint Anselm, and finished with a record of 2–3, being outscored by their opponents by a total of 74 to 32.

Schedule
Scoring during this era awarded 4 points for a touchdown, 2 points for a conversion kick (extra point), and 5 points for a field goal. Teams played in the one-platoon system and the forward pass was not yet legal. Games were played in two halves rather than four quarters.

A report by the student manager of the team, Lewis H. Kittredge, indicates that two other games had been planned for the season but had to be cancelled; one against McGaw Institute (Merrimack, New Hampshire) and another against the "Andover second eleven" (Phillips Academy of Andover, Massachusetts). Kittredge would go on to become president of the Peerless Motor Company.

Roster

Source:

Notes

References

New Hampshire
New Hampshire Wildcats football seasons
New Hampshire football